Rock Falls is a city in Whiteside County, Illinois, United States. The recorded population was 8,606 at the 2020 census, down 7.12% from 9,266 in 2010. The city is located on the Rock River, directly opposite its twin city of Sterling.

Geography 
Rock Falls is separated from its twin city, Sterling, to the North by the Rock River.

Demographics 

At the 2000 census there were 9,580 people, 3,895 households, and 2,559 families living in the city. The racial makeup of the city was 91.78% White, 0.88% African American, 0.45% Native American, 0.26% Asian, 4.71% from other races, and 1.92% from two or more races. Hispanic or Latino of any race were 11.54%.

Of the 3,895 households 30.7% had children under the age of 18 living with them, 47.5% were married couples living together, 13.7% had a female householder with no husband present, and 34.3% were non-families. 29.4% of households were one person and 13.9% were one person aged 65 or older. The average household size was 2.43 and the average family size was 2.99.

The age distribution was 25.5% under the age of 18, 9.0% from 18 to 24, 27.6% from 25 to 44, 21.9% from 45 to 64, and 15.9% 65 or older. The median age was 36 years. For every 100 females, there were 90.8 males. For every 100 females age 18 and over, there were 87.5 males.

The median household income was $34,442 and the median family income was $41,803. Males had a median income of $32,733 versus $21,092 for females. The per capita income for the city was $16,524. About 10.3% of families and 11.5% of the population were below the poverty line, including 14.8% of those under age 18 and 6.8% of those age 65 or over.

Education 
Rock Falls has 4 school districts. Rock Falls Elementary School District #13 consists of Riverdale Preschool Center, Dillon Elementary School, Merrill Intermediate School, and Rock Falls Middle School. East Coloma-Nelson CESD #20 operates East Coloma-Nelson grade school. Montmorency CCSD #145 operates Montmorency grade school. Thome School serves as the towns special needs institution.

The Roman Catholic Diocese of Rockford runs one school in the city: St. Andrew's School, serving as both grade school and middle school. This school serve a local parish, St. Andrew Catholic Church.

Arts and culture
The City of Rock Falls hosts many annual events each year. Some of the most popular events are: Percussion-Paloosa (February), Rock Falls Spring Challenge (May), Bass Pro Shop's Big Cat Quest Catfish Tournament (June), Summer Splash (June), River Chase Boat Races (June), Pink Heals Tour (July), Whiteside County Barn Tour (July), Touch a Truck (August), Fiesta Days (September), Bridge the Communities 5K/10K race (September), The Hennepin Hundred 100k Ultra race (October) and Hometown Holidays (November).

Parks and recreation 
The City of Rock Falls and Township of Coloma have 16 parks (over 100 acres) in which one can use baseball diamonds, basketball courts, tennis courts, disc golf, open fields, playground equipment, pavilions, picnic areas, or a bandshell. Also, with the close proximity of the Rock River, the Hennepin Feeder Canal, and a lake in Centennial Park where one can use boats ramps, canoes, paddle boats, or engage in fishing.

Two eighteen-hole mid-range disc golf courses are located in Rock Falls: Nims Park and Joshua Park.

Infrastructure

Airport

Roads
Interstate 88 (west)
U.S. Route 30
Illinois Route 40

Electric utility
Rock Falls has a municipal electrical system, which generates its own power using a 2 megawatt low-head hydro-electric plant on the Rock River. Current electric rate is 67% higher than Com Ed. Water and sewer minimum charge is now up to $71.85.

Notable people 

 Louie Bellson, drummer, creator of the double bass drumkit
 Seth Blair, minor league baseball player for Boston Red Sox
 Frank Harts, actor
 Cal Howe, professional baseball player for Chicago Cubs
 Otis Adelbert Kline, songwriter, an adventure novelist and literary agent
 Gary Kolb, professional baseball player for St. Louis Cardinals, Milwaukee Braves, New York Mets and Pittsburgh Pirates
 Jake Junis, professional baseball player for Kansas City Royals
 Zelma O'Neal, actress and singer
 Mariya Takeuchi, singer and songwriter (international exchange student)
David Turk, attorney and 21st United States deputy secretary of energy
 Nicholas Sheley, murderer, born in Sterling, raised in Rock Falls.

References

External links
City Website

Cities in Whiteside County, Illinois
Cities in Illinois